This is a list of all astronauts who have engaged in an EVA by partly or fully leaving a spacecraft, exclusive of extravehicular activity on the lunar surface.  It is ordered chronologically by the date of first spacewalk.

For a list of astronauts who have performed lunar EVA ("moonwalks") see List of Apollo astronauts who walked on the Moon. For the 2017 docudrama film about Alexei Leonov, see The Spacewalker.

The following 11 countries have flown spacewalkers: United States of America 129, Russia (formerly Soviet Union) 66, China 11, Canada, France, Japan 4, Germany 3 , Italy, Switzerland, Sweden and Great Britain 1 each. There have been 16 women who have taken part in an EVA.

List

See also 
 List of cumulative spacewalk records
 List of spacewalks and moonwalks 1965–1999
 List of spacewalks 2000–2014
 List of spacewalks since 2015

References

External links
 

Spacewalkers
Spacewalkers
Spacewalkers